Bodmin is a town and civil parish in Cornwall, England, United Kingdom. It is situated south-west of Bodmin Moor.

The extent of the civil parish corresponds fairly closely to that of the town so is mostly urban in character. It is bordered to the east by Cardinham parish, to the southeast by Lanhydrock parish, to the southwest and west by Lanivet parish, and to the north by Helland parish.

Bodmin had a population of 14,736 as of the 2011 Census. It was formerly the county town of Cornwall until the Crown Courts moved to Truro which is also the administrative centre (before 1835 the county town was Launceston). Bodmin was in the administrative North Cornwall District until local government reorganisation in 2009 abolished the District (see also Cornwall Council). The town is part of the North Cornwall parliamentary constituency, which is represented by Scott Mann MP.

Bodmin Town Council is made up of sixteen councillors who are elected to serve a term of four years. Each year, the Council elects one of its number as Mayor to serve as the town's civic leader and to chair council meetings.

Situation and origin of the name
The name of the town probably derives from the Cornish "Bod-meneghy", meaning "dwelling of or by the sanctuary of monks". Variant spellings recorded include Botmenei in 1100, Bodmen in 1253, Bodman in 1377 and Bodmyn in 1522. The Bodman spelling also appears in sources and maps from the 16th and 17th centuries, most notably in the celebrated map of Cornwall produced by John Speed but actually engraved by the Dutch cartographer Jodocus Hondius the Elder (1563–1612) in Amsterdam in 1610 (published in London by Sudbury and Humble in 1626).

The hamlets of Cooksland, Dunmere and Turfdown are in the parish.

History
St. Petroc founded a monastery in Bodmin in the 6th century and gave the town its alternative name of Petrockstow. The monastery was deprived of some of its lands at the Norman conquest but at the time of Domesday still held eighteen manors, including Bodmin, Padstow and Rialton. Bodmin is one of the oldest towns in Cornwall, and the only large Cornish settlement recorded in the Domesday Book in 1086. In the 15th century the Norman church of St Petroc was largely rebuilt and stands as one of the largest churches in Cornwall (the largest after the cathedral at Truro). Also built at that time was an abbey of canons regular, now mostly ruined. For most of Bodmin's history, the tin industry was a mainstay of the economy.

An inscription on a stone built into the wall of a summer house in Lancarffe furnishes proof of a settlement in Bodmin in the early Middle Ages. It is a memorial to one "Duno[.]atus son of Me[.]cagnus" and has been dated from the 6th to 8th centuries.

Arthur Langdon (1896) records three Cornish crosses at Bodmin; one was near the Berry Tower, one was outside Bodmin Gaol and another was in a field near Castle Street Hill. There is also Carminow Cross at a road junction southeast of the town.

The Black Death killed half of Bodmin's population in the mid 14th century (1,500 people).

Rebellions
Bodmin was the centre of three Cornish uprisings. The first was the Cornish Rebellion of 1497 when a Cornish army, led by Michael An Gof, a blacksmith from St. Keverne and Thomas Flamank, a lawyer from Bodmin, marched to Blackheath in London where they were eventually defeated by 10,000 men of the King's army under Baron Daubeny. Then, in the autumn of 1497, Perkin Warbeck tried to usurp the throne from Henry VII. Warbeck was proclaimed King Richard IV in Bodmin but Henry had little difficulty crushing the uprising. In 1549, Cornishmen, allied with other rebels in neighbouring Devon, rose once again in rebellion when the staunchly Protestant Edward VI tried to impose a new Prayer Book. The lower classes of Cornwall and Devon were still strongly attached to the Roman Catholic religion and again a Cornish army was formed in Bodmin which marched across the border into Devon to lay siege to Exeter. This became known as the Prayer Book Rebellion. Proposals to translate the Prayer Book into Cornish were suppressed and in total 4,000 people were killed in the rebellion.

Bodmin Borough Police
The Borough of Bodmin was one of the 178 municipal boroughs which under the auspices of the Municipal Corporations Act 1835 was mandated to create an electable council and a Police Watch Committee responsible for overseeing a police force in the town. The new system directly replaced the Parish Constables that had policed the borough since time immemorial and brought paid, uniformed and accountable law enforcement for the first time. Bodmin Borough Police was the municipal police force for the Borough of Bodmin from 1836 to 1866. The creation of the Cornwall Constabulary in 1857 put pressure on smaller municipal police forces to merge with the county. The two-man force of Bodmin came under threat almost immediately, but it would take until 1866 for the Mayor of Bodmin and the Chairman of the Police Watch Committee to agree on the terms of amalgamation. After a public enquiry, the force was disbanded in January 1866 and policing of the borough was deferred to the county from thereon.

"Bodmin Town"
The song "Bodmin Town" was collected from the Cornishman William Nichols at Whitchurch, Devon, in 1891 by Sabine Baring-Gould who published a version in his A Garland of Country Song (1924).

Churches

Parish church of St Petroc

The existing church building is dated 1469–72 and was until the building of Truro Cathedral the largest church in Cornwall. The tower which remains from the original Norman church and stands on the north side of the church (the upper part is 15th century) was, until the loss of its spire in 1699, 150 ft high. The building underwent two Victorian restorations and another in 1930. It is now listed Grade I. There are a number of interesting monuments, most notably that of Prior Vivian which was formerly in the Priory Church (Thomas Vivian's effigy lying on a chest: black Catacleuse stone and grey marble). The font of a type common in Cornwall is of the 12th century: large and finely carved.

Other churches
The Chapel of St Thomas Becket is a ruin of a 14th-century building in Bodmin churchyard. The holy well of St Guron is a small stone building at the churchyard gate. The Berry Tower is all that remains of the former church of the Holy Rood and there are even fewer remains from the substantial Franciscan Friary established ca. 1240: a gateway in Fore Street and two pillars elsewhere in the town. The Roman Catholic Abbey of St Mary and St Petroc, formerly belonging to the Canons Regular of the Lateran was built in 1965 next to the already existing seminary. The Roman Catholic parish of Bodmin includes a large area of North Cornwall and there are churches also at Wadebridge, Padstow and Tintagel. In 1881 the Roman Catholic mass was celebrated in Bodmin for the first time since 1539. A church was planned in the 1930s but delayed by the Second World War: the Church of St Mary and St Petroc was eventually consecrated in 1965: it was built next to the already existing seminary. There are also five other churches in Bodmin, including a Methodist church.

Archdeaconry of Bodmin

Sites of interest

Institutions
Bodmin Jail, operational for over 150 years but now a semi-ruin, was built in the late 18th century, and was the first British prison to hold prisoners in separate cells (though often up to ten at a time) rather than communally. Over fifty prisoners condemned at the Bodmin Assize Court were hanged at the prison. It was also used for temporarily holding prisoners sentenced to transportation, awaiting transfer to the prison hulks lying in the highest navigable reaches of the River Fowey. Also, during the First World War the prison held some of Britain's priceless national treasures including the Domesday Book, the ring and the Crown Jewels of the United Kingdom.

Other buildings of interest include the former Shire Hall, now a tourist information centre, and Victoria Barracks, formerly depot of the now defunct Duke of Cornwall's Light Infantry and now the site of the regimental museum. It includes the history of the regiment from 1702, plus a military library. The original barracks house the regimental museum which was founded in 1925. There is a fine collection of small arms and machine guns, plus maps, uniforms and paintings on display. The Honey Street drill hall was the mobilisation point for reservists being deployed to serve on the Western Front.

Bodmin County Lunatic Asylum, later known as St Lawrence's Hospital, was designed by John Foulston. The humorist, William Robert Hicks, was domestic superintendent in the mid-19th century.

Walker Lines, named after Harold Bridgwood Walker, was a Second World War camp built as an extension to the DCLI Barracks. It was used to harbour men evacuated from Dunkirk and later to house troops for the D-Day landings. In the 1950s it was the site of the JSSL. The site is now an industrial estate but still known as 'Walker Lines'.

Bosvenna House, an Edwardian manor house, was formerly the home of the Royal British Legion Club, but has become a private residence.

There is a sizable single storey Masonic Hall in St Nicholas Street, which is home to no less than eight Masonic bodies.

Other sites
Bodmin Beacon Local Nature Reserve is the hill overlooking the town. The reserve has  of public land and at its highest point it reaches  with the distinctive landmark at the summit.

In 1966, the "Finn VC Estate" was named in honour of Victoria Cross winner James Henry Finn who once lived in the town. An ornate granite drinking bowl which serves the needs of thirsty dogs at the entrance to Bodmin's Priory car park was donated by Prince Chula Chakrabongse of Thailand who lived at Tredethy.

Education
There are no independent schools in the area.

Primary schools
Beacon ACE Academy opened as a primary school for pupils aged between 3–11 in September 2017 following the merger of Beacon Infant and Nursery School and Robartes Junior School. Beacon ACE Academy is part of Kernow Learning Multi Academy Trust]and is rated Good by Ofsted. The school offers places for 420 pupils as well as 30 places within its Nursery and 10 places within its Area Resource Base for pupils with Special Educational Needs.

St Petroc's Voluntary Aided Church of England Primary School, Athelstan Park, Bodmin, was given this title in September 1990 after the amalgamation of St. Petroc's Infant School and St. Petroc's Junior School. St. Petroc's is a large school with some 440 pupils between the ages of four and 11. Eight of its fourteen governors are nominated by the Diocese of Truro or the Parochial Church Council of St. Petroc's, Bodmin.

There are a further two primary schools within Bodmin; Berrycoombe School in the northwest corner of the town, and St. Mary's Catholic Primary School.

Bodmin College
Bodmin College is a large state comprehensive school for ages 11–18 on the outskirts of the town and on the edge of Bodmin Moor. Its headmistress is Ms Seward-Adams. The college is home to the nationally acclaimed "Bodmin College Jazz Orchestra", founded and run by the previous Director of Music, Adrian Evans, until 2007 and more recently, by the current Director, Ben Vincent. In 1997, Systems & Control students at Bodmin College constructed Roadblock, a robot which entered and won the first series of Robot Wars and was succeeded by "The Beast of Bodmin". The school also has one of the largest sixth forms in the county.

Callywith College
Callywith College is a new Further Education college in Bodmin, Cornwall, that opened in September 2017. A new-build college on a site close to the Bodmin Asda supermarket, it will eventually cater for 1,280 students, with 197 staff employed. A total of 660 places will be available in its first year. It is being created with the assistance of the Ofsted Outstanding Truro and Penwith College to serve students aged 16–19 from Bodmin, North Cornwall and East Cornwall. It received the go-ahead in February 2016, funded as a Free School. Its aim is to "provide the outstanding Truro and Penwith College experience for up to 1280 young people in Bodmin and North and East Cornwall."

Army School of Education
Aspirant National Service Sergeant Instructors of the Royal Army Education Corps underwent training at the Army School of Education, situated at the end of the Second World War at Buchanan Castle, Drymen in Scotland, and later, from 1948, at the Walker Lines, Bodmin, until it moved to Wilton Park, Beaconsfield.

Transport
Bodmin Parkway railway station – once known as Bodmin Road – is a principal calling point on the Cornish Main Line about 3½ miles (5½ km) south-east of the town centre. Buses to central Bodmin, Wadebridge, Padstow, Rock, Polzeath, Port Isaac and Camelford depart from outside the station entrance. It is connected to Bodmin town by a branch line that is home to the local steam railway, Bodmin and Wenford Railway.

Bodmin is just off the A30 providing a connection to the M5 motorway at Exeter 62 miles (99 km) northeast.

Bus and coach services connect Bodmin with some other districts of Cornwall and Devon.

Sport and leisure
Bodmin has a non-league football club Bodmin Town playing in the South West Peninsula League; a level 10 league in the English football league system. Their home ground is at Priory Park. Bodmin Rugby Club play rugby union at Clifden Parc and compete in the Tribute Cornwall/Devon league; a level 8 league in the English rugby union system.

The Royal Cornwall Golf Club (now defunct) was located on Bodmin Moor. It was founded in 1889 and became "Royal" in 1891. The club disbanded in the 1950s.

There is an active running club: Bodmin RoadRunners.

Bodmin was a stage finish in 2021 cycling Tour of Britain (Stage 1, 5th September).

Media
Newspapers
Cornish Guardian is a weekly newspaper published every Wednesday in seven separate editions, including the Bodmin edition.

In October 2020, the Bodmin Voice, sister paper to the Newquay Voice, was launched. It is published every Wednesday and focuses centrally on Bodmin.

Radio
Bodmin is the home of NCB Radio, an Internet radio station which aims to bring a dedicated station to North Cornwall.

Notable people
See also :Category:People from Bodmin
 John Arnold (1736–1799), watchmaker, of London
 John Thomas Blight, artist
 Sir E. A. Wallis Budge, Egyptologist and Assyriologist
 Chula Chakrabongse, philanthropist, Prince of Siam
 James Henry Finn, soldier who was awarded the Victoria Cross
 Thomas Flamank, lawyer, co-leader of the Cornish Rebellion, 1497
 John Gale, Australian journalist
 Francis Hamley, British Army officer who administered the South Australian government from 1868 to 1869
Joseph Osbertus Hamley, British Army officer who administered the New Zealand station of the British Army Military Store Department during the New Zealand Wars
William Hamley, founder of Hamleys toyshop
Alice Hext, garden developer
William Robert Hicks, superintendent of the Asylum
Al Hodge former guitarist with the Cornish band The Onyx
Herman Cyril McNeile, "Sapper", novelist
Peter D. Mitchell, Nobel prizewinner, spent the latter part of his career in Bodmin
Ben Oliver, Cornwall County record holder for the 100m and 400m Wheelchair racing and ranked best in the world at 800 metres, having set a new European record.
 Sir Arthur Olver, expert in animal husbandry
Saint Petroc
Sir Arthur Quiller-Couch, poet, novelist and critic
Dan Rogerson, MP
Henry Southwell, vicar of Bodmin, afterwards Bishop of Lewes
Thomas Vivian or Vyvyan, Prior of Bodmin, titular Bishop of Megara

Town twinning
Bodmin is twinned with Bederkesa in Germany; Grass Valley, in California, United States; and Le Relecq-Kerhuon (Ar Releg-Kerhuon in Brittany), France.

Official heraldry
W. H. Pascoe's 1979 A Cornish Armory gives the arms of the priory and the monastery and the seal of the borough.
 Seal – a king enthroned; legend: Sigill comune burgensium bodmine
 Priory – Azure three salmon naiant in pale Argent
 Monastery – Or on a chevron Azure between three lion's heads Purpure three annulets Or

Official events
On Halgaver Moor (Goats' Moor) near Bodmin there was once an annual carnival in July which was on one occasion attended by King Charles II. Halgaver is in the parish of Lanhydrock.

Bodmin Riding, a horseback procession through the town, is a traditional annual ceremony.

'Beating the bounds' and 'hurling'
In 1865–66 William Robert Hicks was mayor of Bodmin, when he revived the custom of Beating the bounds of the town. He was – according to the Dictionary of National Biography – a very good man of business. This still takes place more or less every five years and concludes with a game of Cornish hurling. Hurling survives as a traditional part of beating the bounds at Bodmin, commencing at the close of the 'Beat'. The game is organised by the Rotary club of Bodmin and was last played in 2015. The game is started by the Mayor of Bodmin by throwing a silver ball into a body of water known as the "Salting Pool". There are no teams and the hurl follows a set route. The aim is to carry the ball from the "Salting Pool" via the old A30, along Callywith Road, then through Castle Street, Church Square and Honey Street to finish at the Turret Clock in Fore Street. The participant carrying the ball when it reaches the turret clock will receive a £10 reward from the mayor.

In 2015, beating of the bounds and Cornish hurling took place at Bodmin 8 April organised by the Rotary club of Bodmin.

See also

 List of topics related to Cornwall
 List of Bodmin MPs
 Bodmin Hospital
 Bodmin manumissions
 Beast of Bodmin

References

Further reading
 Henderson, Charles (1935) "Some Notes on Bodmin Priory", in: Essays in Cornish History. Oxford: Clarendon Press; pp. 219–28
 Maclean, Sir John (1870) Parochial and Family History of the Parish and Borough of Bodmin, in the County of Cornwall. (Parochial and Family History of the Deanery of Trigg Minor; pt. 2.) London: Nichols & Sons

External links

 Bodmin Council
 

 
Towns in Cornwall
Cornish capitals
Civil parishes in Cornwall
Cornish Killas
Manors in Cornwall
Former county towns in England